Peter Tersgov Flarup (born 10 April 1976) is a Danish equestrian. He competed in the individual eventing at the 2008 Summer Olympics and the 2020 Summer Olympics.

References

External links
 

1976 births
Living people
Danish male equestrians
Olympic equestrians of Denmark
Equestrians at the 2008 Summer Olympics
Equestrians at the 2020 Summer Olympics